The dhvajastambha (ध्वजस्तम्भ) refers to the flagstaff erected in front of the mukhamaṇḍapa (front pavilion) of a Hindu temple. The dhvajastambha is usually built within the temple walls (prākāra). They are traditionally built of wood and stone, where the wooden variety is often finished with a metal covering (kavaca). The dhvajastambha is a common feature in South Indian temples.

Two other objects that are grouped together with this flagstaff are the bali peetam (altar for offerings) and the vehicle (vahana) of the deity, to whom the temple is dedicated. Symbolically, these three objects are shields that protect the sanctuary of the temple from the impure and undevoted.

See also
 Dhvaja
 Gopuram
 Vahana
 Hindu temple architecture

References

External links

Hindu temple architecture
Religious flags